The Gratitude of Wanda is a 1913 American short drama silent black and white film directed by Wallace Reid, written by Bess Meredyth and starring Pauline Bush, Arthur Rosson, Jessalyn Van Trump and Frank Borzage. Reid also appears in the film.

Cast
 Wallace Reid as Wally
 Pauline Bush
 Arthur Rosson
 Jessalyn Van Trump
 Frank Borzage

References

External links
 
 

American silent short films
Silent American drama films
American black-and-white films
1913 short films
1913 drama films
1913 films
Films directed by Wallace Reid
Films with screenplays by Bess Meredyth
Universal Pictures short films
1910s American films